Local elections were held in the city of Navotas on May 13, 2013 within the Philippine general election. Re-electionist mayor-John Rey Tiangco won with a margin of almost 50% on his closest rival and the incumbent vice-mayor, Patrick Joseph Javier who was replaced by the winner of the vice-mayoral elections.

Opinion polling

Mayoral election

Three-candidate race

Two-candidate race

Vice-mayoral elections

HoR elections

 The Bold text indicates the winner.

Candidates

Partido Navoteño-UNA coalition (Team Navotas)
 Mayor John Rey Tiangco (re-electionist for second term) 
 District II Councilor Clint Geronimo (vice mayor) 
 Rep. Toby Tiangco (re-electionist for second term) 
 Barangay Kagawad Ethel Joy Arriola (councilor, District I) 
 Former Barangay Kagawad Eddie Tarok Manio (re-electionist for third term, councilor, District I) 
 Dr. Rey Monroy (re-electionist for second term, councilor, District I) 
 Former SK Chairman Richard San Juan (re-electionist for second term, councilor, District I) 
 Assistant coach of Air21 Jack Santiago will run again (councilor, District I) 
 Former Barangay Captain Alfredo Boy Vicencio (re-electionist for second term, councilor, District I) 
 Former Barangay Captain Orlie Castro (councilor, District II) 
 Don Don De Guzman (councilor, District II) 
 Marielle Del Rosario (re-electionist for second term, councilor, District II) 
 Ricky Gino Gino (re-electionist for third term, councilor, District II) 
 Arnel Lupisan (councilor, District II) 
 Steve Naval (councilor, District II)

Partido Liberal-NPC coalition (Team Laban  Navotas)
 Vice Mayor Patrick Joseph Javier (mayor) 
 District II Coun. Elsa Bautista-Teodoro (vice mayor) 
 Barangay Kagawad Icoy de Guzman (congressman) 
 Former Barangay Kagawad Manuel Cabingas (councilor, District I)
 Former Barangay Kagawad Jojo Magpoc (councilor, District I) 
 Former Barangay Kagawad Ronnie Salvador (councilor, District I) 
 Barangay Captain Lito Sulit (councilor, District I) 
 Dok. Nelson Varela (councilor, District I) 
 SK Chairman Nico Magbiray (councilor, District II) 
 Ferdinand Pascual (councilor, District II) 
 Drydel Raymundo (councilor, District II)

PLM
 PLM - Severino Mendoza (councilor, District II)

Independent
 Joselito Alvarez (councilor, District I) 
 Joseph Kwe (councilor, District I)  
 Arlan Alarcon (councilor, District II)

Party-switching

Incumbents who will run for other positions, or will not run

Results

House of Representatives elections

Toby Tiangco is the incumbent. He is under Partido Navoteño, the ruling local party, which will contest this election at the banner of the United Nationalist Alliance. (He is also UNA's national secretary-general.)

City Council elections
Each of Navotas's two legislative districts elects six councilors to the City Council. The six candidates with the highest number of votes wins the seats per district. Some who are running are the same names from 2010.

District 1

 
 
 
 
 
 
|-
|colspan=5 bgcolor=black|

District 2

 
 
 
 
 
 
|-
|colspan=5 bgcolor=black|

 
 
 
 

Notes
 A^ Initially, UNA (as Partido Navoteño) had nine seats after the 2010 election. Later on, Councilors Reynaldo Monroy and Ronaldo "Steve" Naval jumped to the party from being independents, increasing its seats to 11. Prior to this election, District I Coun. Bernardo Nazal died, leaving his seat vacant and decreasing UNA's seat total to 10.
 B^ Technically, District II Coun. Elsa Bautista is under the Nationalist People's Coalition, which contests this election in alliance with the Liberals. Bautista became a member of NPC in 2012.
 C^ Initially, there are three independent councilors (Monroy, Bautista and Naval) after the 2010 election, but they later jumped to major parties in 2012.

References

External links
 2013 Philippine election results, NAVOTAS CITY (NCR third district) - Commission on Elections
 

2013 Philippine local elections
Elections in Navotas
2013 elections in Metro Manila